The 2006 Georgia Southern Eagles football team represented the Georgia Southern Eagles of Georgia Southern University during the 2006 NCAA Division I-AA football season. The Eagles played their home games at Paulson Stadium in Statesboro, Georgia. The team was coached by Brian VanGorder, in his first and only year as head coach for the Eagles.

On the Friday morning prior to the first game of the season, former Georgia Southern head coach Erk Russell died aged 80 from a stroke. Russell had addressed the team on the night before.

Schedule

References

Georgia Southern
Georgia Southern Eagles football seasons
Georgia Southern Eagles football